Eren is a Turkish name. 

Eren or EREN may also refer to:

 Eren, Alaca, a village in Çorum Province, Turkey
 Eren-chan, a Japanese idol and singer-song writer
 Eren Holding, a Turkish conglomerate
 Eren Yeager, the protagonist of the manga series Attack on Titan
 Erenhot, a city in Inner Mongolia, China
 Bitlis Eren University, a university located in Bitlis, Turkey
 Institute for Armenian Research, a Turkish think tank

See also
 Aaron (disambiguation)
 Erin (disambiguation)